The Jim Gregory General Manager of the Year Award is awarded annually to the top National Hockey League general manager as voted by "a 41-member panel that included all 31 general managers, five NHL executives and five media members." First awarded in 2010, the award was renamed in 2019 after the death of former NHL executive Jim Gregory. The current title holder is Joe Sakic, of the Colorado Avalanche.

History
In 1993, Brian Burke, who was at the time working for the league, suggested the General Manager of the Year Award. However, it was not created until the 2009–10 season. It was presented during the 2010 Stanley Cup Finals at the annual GM meeting, rather than during the Awards ceremony with the majority of the other NHL Awards. The next season, it was announced that the award would be included in the full ceremony.

On November 19, 2019, the NHL announced it would rename the award in honour of Jim Gregory, the recently deceased former general manager of the Toronto Maple Leafs and former NHL executive. The official name is changed to the "Jim Gregory General Manager of the Year Award."

On June 22, 2021, New York Islanders General Manager Lou Lamoriello became the first general manager to win the award twice.

Winners

Key

See also
List of National Hockey League awards
List of NHL General Managers

References
General
NHL General Manager of the Year Award at NHL.com

Specific

National Hockey League trophies and awards
+
+
Awards established in 2010